The Fiat 512 is a passenger car produced by Italian automobile manufacturer Fiat between 1926 and 1928. The car was developed from the 510 with modified suspension and brakes. The 3.4-liter straight-six engine produced .

It was produced in 2,600 examples.

References
Fiat Personenwagen, by Fred Steiningen, 1994. 

512
Cars introduced in 1926